Gulzar Kalle, also Gulzar, is a village of Bannu District in the Khyber Pakhtunkhwa province of Pakistan. It is located at 32°59'35N 70°41'49E with an altitude of 321 metres (1056 feet).

References

Populated places in Bannu District